This is a list of defunct airlines of Finland.

See also

 List of airlines of Finland
 List of airports in Finland

References

Finland
Airlines
Airlines, defunct